"The Sick Rose" is a poem by William Blake, originally published in Songs of Innocence and of Experience as the 39th plate; the incipit of the poem is O Rose thou art sick. Blake composed the poem sometime after 1789, and presented it with an illuminated border and illustration, typical of his self-publications. Since the 20th century, the poem has been the subject of scrutiny by scholars for its oblique and enigmatic meaning, and bizarre, suggestive imagery.

Text 

O Rose thou art sick,
The invisible worm
That flies in the night,
In the howling storm,

Has found out thy bed
Of crimson joy:
And his dark secret love
Does thy life destroy.

Analysis
Nathan Cervo describes the poem as "One of the most baffling and enigmatic in the English language". The rose and worm in the poem have been seen as "figures of humanity", although Michael Riffaterre doubts the direct equivalence of Man as a worm; when Blake makes this comparison in other places, Riffaterre notes, he is explicit about it. Nevertheless, the "lesson of the worm may be applicable to human experience".

The rhyme scheme is ABCB. The scansion is difficult to place, due to a lack of pattern; the stanzas are asymmetrical: the first has syllables of 5,6,5,5, and the second of 5,4,6,5. Punctuation is also irregular: there is no comma after "O Rose", and yet there is a comma [,] after "worm".

The poem was set to music by Benjamin Britten in his 1943 Serenade for Tenor, Horn and Strings, where it forms the movement "Elegy". British band Amplifier set the poem to music on their 2011 album The Octopus. Verses of the poem also comprised and inspired the 1991 song "Love's Secret Domain" by English group Coil.

References

External links 

1794 poems
Songs of Innocence and of Experience